Murat Doymus (born 19 November 1985 in Germany) is a German retired footballer.

Career

In 2012, Doymus signed for Azerbaijani club Sumgayit, who contacted him after he played against them for Berliner AK 07 in a friendly in Turkey. Initially, he was hesitant to sign but was persuaded by teammate Pardis Fardjad-Azad, who signed after his contract expired.

Comparing football in Germany to football in Azerbaijan, Doymus stated that there is less of a fan culture in Azerbaijan.

In 2015, he founded the first eSports club in Wiesbaden.

References

External links
 Murat Doymus at Soccerway

German footballers
Living people
Association football defenders
1985 births
German people of Turkish descent
FC Viktoria 1889 Berlin players
Türkiyemspor Berlin players
Berliner AK 07 players
TSV Schott Mainz players